West India Dock Road is a road in Limehouse in London's East End. It connects Commercial Road with the entrance to the West India Docks.

History
Ralph Walker, engineer of the West India Dock company, laid the road out in 1802. A single storey building served as a toll booth until 1871.

Historic buildings on the road include the Strangers' Home for Asiatics, Africans and South Sea Islanders (opened 1857, demolished 1937) and the West India Docks railway station (opened 6 July 1840, closed 3 May 1926).

References

Limehouse